LLHS may refer to:
 Hatzor Airbase, an Israeli Air Force military air base
 Laval Liberty High School, Laval, Quebec, Canada
 Las Lomas High School, Walnut Creek, California, United States
 Los Lunas High School, Los Lunas, New Mexico, United States